The Canon EOS 5D Mark III is a professional-grade 22.3 megapixels full-frame digital single-lens reflex (DSLR) camera made by Canon.

Succeeding the EOS 5D Mark II, the Mark III was announced on 2 March 2012. This date coincided with the 25th anniversary of the announcement of the first camera in the EOS line, the EOS 650, and was also Canon's 75th anniversary. The Mark III went on sale later in March with a retail price of $3,499 in the US, £2999 in the UK, and €3569 in the Eurozone.

On 25 August 2016, Canon announced the camera's successor, the Canon EOS 5D Mark IV.

Features

New features over the EOS 5D Mark II are:
 Resolution increased to 22.3 effective megapixels full-frame CMOS sensor (5D Mark II has 21.1 megapixels)
 DIGIC 5+ image processor (as opposed to the DIGIC 4)
 Maximum ISO speed increased to ISO 25600 (50, 51200, 102400 as optional expanded settings) – Compared to ISO 6400 as optional maximum setting (50, 12800, and 25600 as optional expanded settings)
 New 61-point autofocus (AF) system with 41 cross-type AF points and five dual cross-type points, High-density Reticular AF, and EOS iTR (Intelligent Tracking and Recognition) – none AF points plus six Assist Points on the 5D Mark II. The Mark III's autofocus system was inherited from the then recently announced EOS-1D X, and marks the first time since the EOS-3 film SLR that Canon has put its top-of-the-line autofocus system in a non-1-series body.
 Faster continuous shooting at 6 fps (3.9 fps for the 5D Mark II)
 New metering zones with 63 zones – compared to TTL, full aperture, 35 zones
 Silent, low vibration TTL shooting modes (single shot or 3 fps) – compared to live-view-only silent shooting modes.
 New 100% viewfinder coverage that offers 0.71× magnification – compared to 98% viewfinder coverage
 Larger 3.2″ (8.1 cm) LCD with 3:2 aspect ratio (3″/7.5 cm LCD screen with approx. 920,000 dots resolution, in 4:3 ratio on the 5D Mark II). In turn, this means that the native still images of the Mk III completely fill the screen, while the Mk II's native images are displayed with a black border on the bottom of the LCD. Also, while HD video remains letterboxed on the Mk III LCD, as on the Mk II, the 3:2 ratio allows more of the screen to be used for video display.
 Headphone-out to monitor audio (the previous one having none)
 Dual card slots: one CompactFlash (CF) with full UDMA support, and one SD (including SDHC and SDXC cards, but does not exploit the UHS-I bus) – the Mark II has only one CF slot.
 Eyecup Eg – as opposed to the Eyecup Eb
 Improved weather sealing (resistant to water and dust, although it is not waterproof)
As with the 5D Mark II, the shutter life is rated at 150,000 cycles.

Known defects

Canon issued a product advisory indicating that the camera's LCD panel, when illuminated in extremely dark environments, may impact the camera's light metering when shooting. Any camera bodies sold with the issue will be fixed by Canon free of charge, and any body shipped after the first week of May 2012 likely had the defect already rectified.

Firmware updates

Firmware 1.2.1 was released on 30 April 2013 to allow the camera to output uncompressed video via HDMI and permit autofocus ability up to f/8.

Firmware 1.2.3 was released on 30 October 2013, fixing a number of minor bugs.

Firmware 1.3.3 was released on 29 January 2015, fixing minor menu issues and improved AF control-ability when shooting in Live View mode with a wide-angle lens.

Firmware 1.3.4 was released on 14 November 2016, it corrects a phenomenon in which when using the camera with the EF 70-300mm f/4-5.6 IS II USM lens, even if lens aberration correction is set to "Enable", correction will not be applied.

Firmware 1.3.5 was released on 29 November 2017, it corrects a phenomenon in which standard exposure may not be obtained, or an irregular exposure may result, when Silent LV (Live View) shooting with the following TS-E lenses: TS-E 50mm f/2.8L MACRO, TS-E 90mm f/2.8L MACRO, or TS-E 135mm f/4L MACRO.

Firmware 1.3.6 was released on 12 September 2019, it corrects a PTP communications vulnerability, and corrects a vulnerability related to firmware update.

Notable works shot on the camera 
 Kung Fury
 Wallpaper for macOS El Capitan
Hale County This Morning, This Evening

Cubesat

In July 2020 an attempt was made to launch a cubesat named CE-SAT 1B equipped with a 5DIII sensor on an Electron rocket. The rocket failed to reach orbit.

References

External links

 EOS 5D Mark III Canon U.S.A. | Consumer & Home Office

5D Mark III
Cameras introduced in 2012
Articles containing video clips
Full-frame DSLR cameras